This is a list of the Canadian Billboard magazine Canadian Hot 100 number-ones of 2010.

Note that Billboard publishes charts with an issue date approximately 7–10 days in advance.

Chart history

See also
2010 in music
List of number-one singles (Canada)
List of number-one music downloads of 2010 (Canada)
List of Canadian number-one albums of 2010

References

Canada Hot 100
2010
2010 in Canadian music